Derdi-Janbai is a village and former non-salute Charan princely state on Saurashtra peninsula in Gujarat, western India.

History 
The petty princely state, in Gohelwar prant, was ruled by Charan chieftains.

In 1901, it comprised a single village, with a population of 492, yielding 3,000 Rupees state revenue (1903-4, mostly from land), paying no tribute. It had an area of 2 sq. miles.

References

External links and Sources 
 Imperial Gazetteer, on DSAL.UChicago.edu - Kathiawar

Princely states of Gujarat

Charan
Charan princely states